Cali mammarenavirus is a species of virus in the family Arenaviridae.

References

Arenaviridae